Esen Buqa may refer to:

 Esen Buqa I, Khan of the Chagatai Khanate
 Esen Buqa II, Khan of Moghulistan